Prasophyllum lindleyanum, commonly known as the green leek orchid, is a species of orchid endemic to south-eastern Australia. It has a single smooth, tube-shaped leaf and up to twenty scented, greenish flowers with a greenish or white labellum with a pink tinge.

Description
As with others in the genus, the flowers are inverted so that the labellum is above the column rather than below it and the dorsal sepal is the lowest part of the flower. The laterals sepals are a similar size and shape to the dorsal sepal but are erect and spread apart from each other. Flowering occurs from September to January and is more prolific after fire the previous summer.

Taxonomy and naming
Prasophyllum lindleyanum was first formally described in 1871 by Heinrich Reichenbach and the description was published in Beitrage zur Systematischen Pflanzenkunde. The specific epithet (lindleyanum) honours John Lindley who died a few years before.

Distribution and habitat
The green leek orchid is uncommon throughout its range. It grows in woodland, heath and sub-alpine herbfield in Victoria and Tasmania, possibly also on the far south coast of New South Wales.

References

External links 
 
 

lindleyanum
Flora of New South Wales
Flora of Tasmania
Flora of Victoria (Australia)
Endemic orchids of Australia
Plants described in 1871